The 2006–07 Seattle SuperSonics season was the 40th season of the Seattle SuperSonics in the National Basketball Association (NBA). The team finished in 14th place in the Western Conference with a 31–51 record and couldn't reach the playoffs for a second consecutive season.

Ray Allen was selected to play in the 2007 NBA All-Star Game, but couldn't participate due to season-ending surgeries on both ankles. Following the season, he was traded to the Boston Celtics and Rashard Lewis was dealt to the Orlando Magic.

Draft picks

Roster

Pre-season

|- style="background:#cfc;"
| 1
| October 11
| @ Portland
| W 99–89
| Rashard Lewis (17)
| Nick Collison (14)
| Earl Watson (4)
| Rose Garden14,073
| 1–0
|- style="background:#fcc;"
| 2
| October 12
| @ L. A. Lakers
| L 101–104
| Nick Collison (20)
| Robert Swift (8)
| Earl Watson (4)
| Honda Center11,659
| 1–1
|- style="background:#fcc;"
| 3
| October 15
| @ Chicago
| L 105–110 (OT)
| Ray Allen (22)
| Chris Wilcox (12)
| Earl Watson (8)
| Allen Fieldhouse12,758
| 1–2
|- style="background:#fcc;"
| 4
| October 20
| Portland
| L 95–103
| Ray Allen (16)
| Robert Swift (6)
| Luke Ridnour (6)
| KeyArena14,061
| 1–3
|- style="background:#fcc;"
| 5
| October 21
| @ L. A. Clippers
| L 82–86
| Ray Allen (19)
| Rashard Lewis, Nick Collison (9)
| Earl Watson (6)
| Staples Center14,089
| 1–4
|- style="background:#cfc;"
| 6
| October 23
| @ Phoenix
| W 108–102
| Ray Allen (25)
| Nick Collison (9)
| Luke Ridnour (6)
| US Airways Center18,422
| 2–4
|- style="background:#cfc;"
| 7
| October 25
| Sacramento
| W 103–88
| Rashard Lewis (16)
| Nick Collison (6)
| Luke Ridnour (8)
| KeyArena11,887
| 3–4
|- style="background:#cfc;"
| 8
| October 26
| Golden State
| W 111–107 (OT)
| Nick Collison (19)
| Nick Collison (12)
| Luke Ridnour (12)
| Spokane Arena4,860
| 4–4

Regular season

Standings

Record vs. opponents

Game log

|-bgcolor=#fcc
| 1
| November 1
| Portland
| L 106–110
| Rashard Lewis (25)
| Rashard Lewis (8)
| Luke Ridnour (13)
| KeyArena17,072
| 0–1
|-bgcolor=#fcc
| 2
| November 3
| @ L. A. Lakers
| L 112–118
| Ray Allen (30)
| Chris Wilcox (12)
| Earl Watson (7)
| Staples Center18,997
| 0–2
|-bgcolor=#cfc
| 3
| November 5
| L. A. Lakers
| W 117–101
| Ray Allen (32)
| Chris Wilcox (8)
| Luke Ridnour (7)
| KeyArena17,072
| 1–2
|-bgcolor=#fcc
| 4
| November 7
| @ Miami
| L 87–90
| Rashard Lewis (23)
| Nick Collison (10)
| Earl Watson (6)
| American Airlines Arena19,600
| 1–3
|-bgcolor=#fcc
| 5
| November 8
| @ Orlando
| L 87–88
| Ray Allen (21)
| Danny Fortson (8)
| Luke Ridnour (6)
| Amway Arena16,312
| 1–4
|-bgcolor=#cfc
| 6
| November 10
| @ Charlotte
| W 99–85
| Ray Allen (26)
| Nick Collison (15)
| Luke Ridnour (7)
| Charlotte Bobcats Arena13,515
| 2–4
|-bgcolor=#cfc
| 7
| November 11
| @ Atlanta
| W 113–112 (OT)
| Ray Allen (33)
| Chris Wilcox (15)
| Luke Ridnour (5)
| Philips Arena19,309
| 3–4
|-bgcolor=#cfc
| 8
| November 13
| @ New Jersey
| W 119–113
| Luke Ridnour (32)
| Rashard Lewis (11)
| Luke Ridnour, Earl Watson (7)
| Continental Airlines Arena14,392
| 4–4
|-bgcolor=#fcc
| 9
| November 15
| Philadelphia
| L 90–96
| Rashard Lewis (25)
| Rashard Lewis, Chris Wilcox (15)
| Luke Ridnour (7)
| KeyArena14,936
| 4–5
|-bgcolor=#fcc
| 10
| November 17
| Utah
| L 109–118
| Ray Allen (32)
| Chris Wilcox (11)
| Luke Ridnour (7)
| KeyArena15,513
| 4–6
|-bgcolor=#fcc
| 11
| November 18
| @ Golden State
| L 95–107
| Ray Allen (34)
| Ray Allen (11)
| Earl Watson (7)
| Oracle Arena17,205
| 4–7
|-bgcolor=#cfc
| 12
| November 20
| New Jersey
| W 99–87
| Ray Allen (29)
| Ray Allen (9)
| Ray Allen, Luke Ridnour (5)
| KeyArena14,621
| 5–7
|-bgcolor=#cfc
| 13
| November 22
| @ L. A. Clippers
| W 95–85
| Rashard Lewis (35)
| Nick Collison, Rashard Lewis (13)
| Luke Ridnour (9)
| Staples Center16,290
| 6–7
|-bgcolor=#fcc
| 14
| November 24
| Sacramento
| L 100–109
| Rashard Lewis (26)
| Chris Wilcox (13)
| Luke Ridnour (8)
| KeyArena16,757
| 6–8
|-bgcolor=#fcc
| 15
| November 26
| San Antonio
| L 78–98
| Ray Allen (21)
| Johan Petro (9)
| Chris Wilcox (5)
| KeyArena15,483
| 6–9
|-bgcolor=#fcc
| 16
| November 29
| Orlando
| L 84–94
| Ray Allen (21)
| Nick Collison (9)
| Ray Allen (5)
| KeyArena14,232
| 6–10

|-bgcolor=#cfc
| 17
| December 1
| Indiana
| W 105–103
| Nick Collison (21)
| Rashard Lewis (9)
| Luke Ridnour (6)
| KeyArena14,413
| 7–10
|-bgcolor=#fcc
| 18
| December 2
| @ Utah
| L 107–109
| Ray Allen (33)
| Rashard Lewis (8)
| Luke Ridnour (10)
| EnergySolutions Arena19,790
| 7–11
|-bgcolor=#cfc
| 19
| December 5
| Atlanta
| W 102–87
| Rashard Lewis (29)
| Nick Collison, Chris Wilcox (9)
| Luke Ridnour (6)
| KeyArena14,391
| 8–11
|-bgcolor=#cfc
| 20
| December 8
| New Orleans / Oklahoma City
| W 94–74
| Chris Wilcox (19)
| Nick Collison, Chris Wilcox (8)
| Earl Watson (7)
| KeyArena15,913
| 9–11
|-bgcolor=#cfc
| 21
| December 10
| Golden State
| W 117–115
| Luke Ridnour (26)
| Damien Wilkins (9)
| Luke Ridnour (9)
| KeyArena16,138
| 10–11
|-bgcolor=#fcc
| 22
| December 12
| @ Milwaukee
| L 93–94
| Rashard Lewis (26)
| Johan Petro (9)
| Luke Ridnour (8)
| Bradley Center13,374
| 10–12
|-bgcolor=#fcc
| 23
| December 13
| @ Chicago
| L 84–99
| Rashard Lewis (18)
| Rashard Lewis (13)
| Damien Wilkins (7)
| United Center21,812
| 10–13
|-bgcolor=#fcc
| 24
| December 15
| @ Cleveland
| L 84–106
| Chris Wilcox (20)
| Nick Collison (12)
| Earl Watson (6)
| Quicken Loans Arena20,562
| 10–14
|-bgcolor=#fcc
| 25
| December 17
| @ Detroit
| L 93–97
| Rashard Lewis (25)
| Rashard Lewis (11)
| Rashard Lewis, Luke Ridnour (5)
| The Palace of Auburn Hills22,076
| 10–15
|-bgcolor=#fcc
| 26
| December 18
| @ Memphis
| L 2OT 126–134
| Rashard Lewis (36)
| Rashard Lewis (14)
| Luke Ridnour (10)
| FedExForum12,423
| 10–16
|-bgcolor=#fcc
| 27
| December 20
| Dallas
| L 95–103
| Luke Ridnour (21)
| Chris Wilcox (9)
| Luke Ridnour (9)
| KeyArena16,867
| 10–17
|-bgcolor=#cfc
| 28
| December 23
| Toronto
| W 110–97
| Ray Allen (28)
| forston, Mickaël Gelabale (9)
| Luke Ridnour (6)
| KeyArena14,611
| 11–17
|-bgcolor=#cfc
| 29
| December 26
| New Orleans / Oklahoma City
| W 102–94
| Luke Ridnour (27)
| Chris Wilcox (10)
| Luke Ridnour (9)
| KeyArena15,319
| 12–17
|-bgcolor=#fcc
| 30
| December 28
| @ Denver
| L 98–112
| Damien Wilkins (26)
| Chris Wilcox (7)
| Earl Watson (7)
| Pepsi Center17,400
| 12–18
|-bgcolor=#fcc
| 31
| December 29
| @ Minnesota
| L 82–101
| Ray Allen (14)
| Nick Collison, Chris Wilcox (7)
| Ray Allen, Luke Ridnour (4)
| Target Center19,356
| 12–19
|-bgcolor=#cfc
| 32
| December 31
| Boston
| W 101–95
| Chris Wilcox (24)
| Luke Ridnour (11)
| Luke Ridnour (3)
| KeyArena15,557
| 13–19

|-bgcolor=#fcc
| 33
| January 2
| @ Dallas
| L 88–112
| Ray Allen (27)
| Nick Collison (7)
| Earl Watson (6)
| American Airlines Center20,245
| 13–20
|-bgcolor=#fcc
| 34
| January 3
| @ Houston
| L 96–103
| Ray Allen (32)
| Nick Collison (7)
| Luke Ridnour (8)
| Toyota Center11,133
| 13–21
|-bgcolor=#fcc
| 35
| January 5
| New York
| L 93–111
| Chris Wilcox (13)
| Nick Collison, Chris Wilcox (6)
| Earl Watson (11)
| KeyArena16,841
| 13–22
|-bgcolor=#fcc
| 36
| January 6
| @ Golden State
| L 104–108
| Ray Allen (38)
| Nick Collison (10)
| Earl Watson (11)
| Oracle Arena17,007
| 13–23
|-bgcolor=#fcc
| 37
| January 9
| @ Phoenix
| L 102–113
| Nick Collison (29)
| Nick Collison (21)
| Ray Allen, Earl Watson (9)
| US Airways Center18,422
| 13–24
|-bgcolor=#fcc
| 38
| January 10
| Miami
| L 103–107
| Ray Allen (29)
| Chris Wilcox (13)
| Earl Watson (11)
| KeyArena15,676
| 13–25
|-bgcolor=#cfc
| 39
| January 12
| Utah
| W 122–114 (OT)
| Ray Allen (54)
| Nick Collison (13)
| Earl Watson (16)
| KeyArena15,391
| 14–25
|-bgcolor=#cfc
| 40
| January 16
| Cleveland
| W 101–96
| Ray Allen (22)
| Nick Collison, Chris Wilcox (12)
| Ray Allen (11)
| KeyArena15,619
| 15–25
|-bgcolor=#cfc
| 41
| January 19
| Milwaukee
| W 99–72
| Ray Allen (21)
| Nick Collison (16)
| Earl Watson (7)
| KeyArena16,249
| 16–25
|-bgcolor=#fcc
| 42
| January 23
| Denver
| L 112–117
| Ray Allen (44)
| Chris Wilcox (12)
| Earl Watson (7)
| KeyArena17,072
| 16–26
|-bgcolor=#cfc
| 43
| January 26
| Minnesota
| W 102–100
| Ray Allen (36)
| Nick Collison (12)
| Earl Watson (10)
| KeyArena16,610
| 17–26
|-bgcolor=#fcc
| 44
| January 28
| L. A. Clippers
| L 76–98
| Ray Allen (15)
| Johan Petro (7)
| Earl Watson (5)
| KeyArena16,195
| 17–27
|-bgcolor=#fcc
| 45
| January 30
| @ Dallas
| L 102–122
| Ray Allen (35)
| Nick Collison (9)
| Ray Allen (7)
| American Airlines Center20,326
| 17–28
|-bgcolor=#fcc
| 46
| January 31
| @ Houston
| L 102–112
| Ray Allen (36)
| Nick Collison (17)
| Earl Watson (8)
| Toyota Center11,908
| 17–29

|-bgcolor=#fcc
| 47
| February 2
| Chicago
| L 101–107
| Ray Allen (29)
| Nick Collison (12)
| Earl Watson (12)
| KeyArena16,291
| 17–30
|-bgcolor=#fcc
| 48
| February 5
| @ Washington
| L 108–118
| Ray Allen (29)
| Chris Wilcox (10)
| Earl Watson (10)
| Verizon Center15,332
| 17–31
|-bgcolor=#cfc
| 49
| February 7
| @ Indiana
| W 103–102
| Ray Allen (33)
| Nick Collison (10)
| Ray Allen (9)
| Conseco Fieldhouse12,923
| 18–31
|-bgcolor=#fcc
| 50
| February 10
| Sacramento
| L 93–114
| Ray Allen (29)
| Chris Wilcox (11)
| Earl Watson (6)
| KeyArena17,072
| 18–32
|-bgcolor=#cfc
| 51
| February 11
| @ Sacramento
| W 114–103
| Ray Allen, Chris Wilcox (25)
| Rashard Lewis (10)
| Luke Ridnour (5)
| ARCO Arena17,317
| 19–32
|-bgcolor=#cfc
| 52
| February 14
| Phoenix
| W 114–90
| Ray Allen (31)
| Nick Collison (15)
| Earl Watson (7)
| KeyArena16,809
| 20–32
|-bgcolor=#cfc
| 53
| February 20
| Memphis
| W 121–105
| Rashard Lewis (34)
| Chris Wilcox (15)
| Luke Ridnour (12)
| KeyArena16,006
| 21–32
|-bgcolor=#fcc
| 54
| February 23
| @ New Orleans / Oklahoma City
| L 97–98
| Ray Allen (32)
| Rashard Lewis (12)
| Ray Allen (6)
| New Orleans Arena17,961
| 21–33
|-bgcolor=#fcc
| 55
| February 24
| @ San Antonio
| L 71–102
| Ray Allen (12)
| Nick Collison (7)
| Ray Allen, Rashard Lewis (3)
| AT&T Center18,797
| 21–34
|-bgcolor=#cfc
| 56
| February 26
| Portland
| W 97–73
| Rashard Lewis (29)
| Ray Allen, Nick Collison (10)
| Luke Ridnour (8)
| KeyArena16,538
| 22–34
|-bgcolor=#fcc
| 57
| February 28
| @ L. A. Clippers
| L 91–96
| Rashard Lewis (21)
| Nick Collison (12)
| Luke Ridnour (7)
| Staples Center19,317
| 22–35

|-bgcolor=#cfc
| 58
| March 1
| L. A. Clippers
| W 77–75
| Rashard Lewis (31)
| Chris Wilcox (13)
| Rashard Lewis (5)
| KeyArena14,601
| 23–35
|-bgcolor=#cfc
| 59
| March 4
| Charlotte
| W 96–89
| Ray Allen (34)
| Nick Collison (10)
| Earl Watson (10)
| KeyArena15,574
| 24–35
|-bgcolor=#cfc
| 60
| March 6
| @ New York
| W 100–99
| Ray Allen (29)
| Ray Allen, Chris Wilcox (8)
| Earl Watson (9)
| Madison Square Garden18,530
| 25–35
|-bgcolor=#fcc
| 61
| March 7
| @ Philadelphia
| L 89–92
| Ray Allen (29)
| Nick Collison (11)
| Earl Watson (9)
| Wachovia Center12,902
| 25–36
|-bgcolor=#fcc
| 62
| March 9
| @ Boston
| L 103–118
| Ray Allen (22)
| Chris Wilcox (10)
| Earl Watson (7)
| TD Banknorth Garden18,435
| 25–37
|-bgcolor=#fcc
| 63
| March 11
| @ Toronto
| L 119–120 (OT)
| Ray Allen (36)
| Rashard Lewis, Johan Petro (13)
| Earl Watson (7)
| Air Canada Centre19,800
| 25–38
|-bgcolor=#fcc
| 64
| March 13
| Detroit
| L 97–101
| Ray Allen (27)
| Johan Petro (9)
| Earl Watson (7)
| KeyArena15,960
| 25–39
|-bgcolor=#fcc
| 65
| March 17
| Golden State
| L 98–99
| Ray Allen (25)
| Nick Collison (18)
| Luke Ridnour, Earl Watson (4)
| KeyArena15,742
| 25–40
|-bgcolor=#cfc
| 66
| March 18
| @ Portland
| W 95–77
| Rashard Lewis (27)
| Rashard Lewis (12)
| Earl Watson (8)
| Rose Garden17,215
| 26–40
|-bgcolor=#fcc
| 67
| March 21
| Washington
| L 106–108
| Chris Wilcox (27)
| Chris Wilcox (22)
| Luke Ridnour, Earl Watson (5)
| KeyArena15,498
| 26–41
|-bgcolor=#cfc
| 68
| March 23
| Minnesota
| W 85–82
| Rashard Lewis (22)
| Chris Wilcox (12)
| Earl Watson (7)
| KeyArena16,794
| 27–41
|-bgcolor=#fcc
| 69
| March 25
| San Antonio
| L 79–120
| Luke Ridnour (16)
| Chris Wilcox (9)
| Luke Ridnour (4)
| KeyArena16,409
| 27–42
|-bgcolor=#cfc
| 70
| March 27
| @ Minnesota
| W 114–106
| Rashard Lewis (35)
| Chris Wilcox (9)
| Three players (4)
| Target Center15,120
| 28–42
|-bgcolor=#cfc
| 71
| March 28
| @ Denver
| W 100–97
| Rashard Lewis (33)
| Nick Collison (13)
| Earl Watson (10)
| Pepsi Center16,847
| 29–42
|-bgcolor=#cfc
| 72
| March 30
| Memphis
| W 120–93
| Nick Collison, Johan Petro (22)
| Nick Collison (12)
| Luke Ridnour (12)
| KeyArena16,469
| 30–42

|-bgcolor=#fcc
| 73
| April 1
| Denver
| L 103–114
| Earl Watson (28)
| Rashard Lewis (9)
| Luke Ridnour (8)
| KeyArena16,659
| 30–43
|-bgcolor=#fcc
| 74
| April 3
| @ San Antonio
| L 91–110
| Chris Wilcox (20)
| Nick Collison, Luke Ridnour (4)
| Earl Watson, Mike Wilks (4)
| AT&T Center18,583
| 30–44
|-bgcolor=#fcc
| 75
| April 4
| @ New Orleans / Oklahoma City
| L 92–101 (OT)
| Rashard Lewis (27)
| Rashard Lewis (10)
| Luke Ridnour (5)
| Ford Center17,021
| 30–45
|-bgcolor=#fcc
| 76
| April 6
| L. A. Lakers
| L 109–112
| Chris Wilcox (32)
| Chris Wilcox (18)
| Earl Watson (8)
| KeyArena17,072
| 30–46
|-bgcolor=#cfc
| 77
| April 7
| @ Utah
| W 106–103
| Rashard Lewis (35)
| Rashard Lewis (8)
| Earl Watson (9)
| EnergySolutions Arena19,911
| 31–46
|-bgcolor=#fcc
| 78
| April 9
| Houston
| L 90–95
| Rashard Lewis (20)
| Nick Collison (13)
| Mike Wilks (8)
| KeyArena16,004
| 31–47
|-bgcolor=#fcc
| 79
| April 11
| @ Phoenix
| L 91–109
| Rashard Lewis (30)
| Chris Wilcox (12)
| Mike Wilks (6)
| US Airways Center18,422
| 31–48
|-bgcolor=#fcc
| 80
| April 14
| @ Portland
| L 102–108
| Rashard Lewis (29)
| Chris Wilcox (11)
| wlks (11)
| KeyArena19,980
| 31–49
|-bgcolor=#fcc
| 81
| April 15
| @ L. A. Lakers
| L 98–109
| Rashard Lewis (24)
| Chris Wilcox (10)
| Mike Wilks (8)
| Staples Center18,997
| 31–50
|-bgcolor=#fcc
| 82
| April 18
| Dallas
| L 75–106
| Rashard Lewis (14)
| Mouhamed Sene (7)
| Randy Livingston (4)
| KeyArena16,117
| 31–51

Player statistics

  Statistics with the Seattle SuperSonics.

Awards
 Ray Allen made his 7th All-Star appearance at the 2007 NBA All-Star Game.

Transactions

Overview

  Signed for the remainder of the season after two 10-day contracts.
  Later waived.

Trades

References

Seattle SuperSonics seasons